The Downtown Terminal is a Brampton Transit bus station serving the central area of Brampton, Ontario, Canada. It is located a block north of the intersection of Main Street and Queen Street, the two main streets in downtown. There is direct access to Via Rail and GO Transit trains at the adjoining Brampton GO Station. Municipal and private-sector partnerships funded this facility and built a six-storey office building above the transit terminal. A portion of the ground level of the building accommodates ticket sales and a heated waiting room.

Bus routes
Brampton Transit
 1/1A Queen
 2 Main (Board at Main Street)
 24 Van Kirk (Board at Main Street)
 25 Edenbrook (Board at Main Street)
 52 McMurchy
Züm
 501/501A Züm Queen
 502 Züm Main (Board at Main Street)
 561 Züm Queen West
GO Transit
 31 Kitchener GO Bus
 33 Kitchener GO Bus
 36 Brampton GO Bus
 37 Orangeville GO Bus

Greyhound (originally Gray Coach Lines) formerly served the terminal on its route from Toronto via Orangeville and Shelburne to Owen Sound. The route was discontinued in early 2010.

References

External links
 Transit Toronto: Brampton Terminal

Brampton
Brampton
GO Transit bus terminals
Transport infrastructure completed in 1991
1991 establishments in Ontario